Missez were an American-German R&B group composed of Tomi, Keysha and Rashe. The group's only released as of 2006 was the single “Love Song” which peaked at #53 on Billboard’s Hot R&B\Hip-Hop Songs chart, staying on the chart for 20 weeks. After that, the group faded into obscurity. The group never released an album.

Discography

Singles

References

External links
Label Website
Official MySpace Page

American contemporary R&B musical groups
American girl groups